= Oh, Those Hanazono Twins =

Japanese manga series

- First tankōbon volume cover

花園さんちのふたごちゃん (Hanazono-sanchi no Futago-chan)
- Genre: Romantic comedy
- Manga
- Written by: Nena Kitajima
- Published by: Kodansha
- English publisher: NA: Kodansha USA (digital)
- Imprint: Shōnen Magazine Comics
- Magazine: Magazine Pocket
- Original run: July 21, 2020 – December 14, 2021
- Volumes: 7
- icon

Oh, Those Hanazono Twins (Japanese: 花園さんちのふたごちゃん, Hepburn: Hanazono-sanchi no Futago-chan) is a Japanese web manga series written and illustrated by Nena Kitajima. It was published on Kodansha's Magazine Pocket website from July 2020 to December 2021, with its chapters collected in seven tankōbon volumes.

== Publication ==
Written and illustrated by Nena Kitajima, Oh, Those Hanazono Twins was published on Kodansha's Magazine Pocket website from July 21, 2020, to December 14, 2021. Kodansha collected its chapters in seven tankōbon volumes, released from December 9, 2020, to February 9, 2022.

In North America, the manga was licensed for English digital release by Kodansha USA. The seven volumes were released from May 3, 2022, to November 29, 2022.

=== Volumes ===
No.	Original release date	Original ISBN	English release date	English ISBN
1	December 9, 2020	978-4-06-521684-2	May 3, 2022	978-1-68491-154-7
2	February 9, 2021	978-4-06-522351-2	June 7, 2022	978-1-68491-205-6
3	April 8, 2021	978-4-06-522986-6	July 5, 2022	978-1-68491-338-1
4	June 9, 2021	978-4-06-523574-4	August 30, 2022	978-1-68491-380-0
5	September 9, 2021	978-4-06-524846-1	September 27, 2022	978-1-68491-421-0
6	November 9, 2021	978-4-06-525993-1	October 25, 2022	978-1-68491-469-2
7	February 9, 2022	978-4-06-526910-7	November 29, 2022	978-1-68491-562-0
